Fran González may refer to:
 Fran González (footballer, born 1969)
 Fran González (footballer, born 1989)
 Fran González (footballer, born 1998)